Taechon Airport(태천비행장) is an airport in Pyongan-bukto, North Korea.

Facilities 
The airfield has a single asphalt runway 11/29 measuring 6450 x 194 feet (1966 x 59 m).  It is sited in a river plain, and has a full-length parallel taxiway which supports dispersed revetments.

References 

Airports in North Korea
North Pyongan